Bakebe is a city in Cameroon located at , at an altitude of . Its time zone is UTC+1.

Populated places in Southwest Region (Cameroon)